"Candidatus Devosia euplotis" is an endosymbiont Candidatus bacteria from the genus of Devosia.

References

Hyphomicrobiales
Bacteria described in 2004
Candidatus taxa